Daybreak is a 2017 Albanian drama film directed by Gentian Koçi. It was selected as the Albanian entry for the Best Foreign Language Film at the 90th Academy Awards, but it was not nominated.

Plot
Leta (Ornela Kapetani) has not been able to pay the rent for several months. When she and her one-year-old son are thrown out of their apartment, they move in with Sophie, an old woman confined to bed, whose daughter has just employed Leta as a caretaker. In order to keep her job and a roof over their head, Leta has to keep Sophie alive at any cost.

Cast
 Ornela Kapetani as Leta
 Suzana Prifti as Sophie
 Kasem Hoxha as Postman
 Hermes Kasimati as Leta's son
 Adele Gjoka as Ola

Accolades
The film received positive reviews during the premiere at the Sarajevo Film Festival. The main Actress, Ornela Kapetani won Best Actress in the Festival.

The director, Gentian Koçi won the Best Director Award during the 15th edition of Tirana International Film Festival. The film also made the Nordic premiere in the Stockholm International Film Festival.

See also
 List of submissions to the 90th Academy Awards for Best Foreign Language Film
 List of Albanian submissions for the Academy Award for Best Foreign Language Film

References

External links
 

2017 films
2017 drama films
Albanian drama films
Albanian-language films
2017 directorial debut films